Upper Cut Meat is a small settlement on the Rosebud Indian Reservation, Todd County, South Dakota, United States. It consists of 11 homes and several others in the surrounding area. The town has a Community Center and a basketball court, as well as a playground.

References

Unincorporated communities in Todd County, South Dakota
Unincorporated communities in South Dakota
Lakota
Rosebud Indian Reservation